Sigrid Horne-Rasmussen (22 September 1915 – 24 April 1982) was a Danish stage and film actress. She was married to Danish actor and comedian Dirch Passer.

Filmography 

 Sun Over Denmark – 1936
  – 1938
 I dag begynder livet – 1939
 Skilsmissens børn – 1939
  – 1939
  – 1939
 En ganske almindelig pige – 1940
 En mand af betydning – 1941
 Alle går rundt og forelsker sig – 1941
 Tag til Rønneby Kro – 1941
 Afsporet – 1942
  – 1943
 Det brændende spørgsmål – 1943
  – 1943
  – 1944
 Elly Petersen – 1944
 Bedstemor går amok – 1944
 Teatertosset – 1944
  – 1945
 Stjerneskud – 1947
 De pokkers unger – 1947
  – 1947
  – 1951
 Drömsemester – 1952
  – 1954
 På tro og love – 1955
 Det var på Rundetårn – 1955
 Altid ballade – 1955
  – 1956
  – 1956
 Hvad vil De ha'? – 1956
 Ingen tid til kærtegn – 1957
 Sønnen fra Amerika – 1957
  – 1958
 Krudt og klunker – 1958
 Pigen og vandpytten – 1958
  – 1958
  – 1958
  – 1959
 Soldaterkammerater på efterårsmanøvre – 1961
  – 1961
  – 1961
 Pigen og pressefotografen – 1963
 Majorens oppasser – 1964
  – 1965
 Flådens friske fyre – 1965
  – 1965
 Passer passer piger – 1965
 Pigen og millionæren – 1965
 En ven i bolignøden – 1965
 I, a Lover – 1966
 Pigen og greven – 1966
 Hunger – 1966
  – 1967
 Nyhavns glade gutter – 1967
  – 1968
 Min søsters børn vælter byen – 1968
  – 1969
  – 1969
 Min søsters børn når de er værst – 1971
  – 1971
 Takt og tone i himmelsengen – 1972
  – 1973
  – 1973
  – 1974
  – 1976

References

External links 
 

1915 births
1982 deaths
20th-century Danish actresses
Best Actress Bodil Award winners
Danish film actresses
Danish stage actresses
People from Gentofte Municipality